Fransisca Valentina is an Indonesian taekwondo practitioner. In 2010, she won one of the bronze medals in the women's 46 kg event at the 2010 Asian Games held in Guangzhou, China.

In 2011, she competed in the women's flyweight event at the 2011 World Taekwondo Championships held in Gyeongju, South Korea where she was eliminated in her second match by Brigitte Yagüe of Spain. In the same year, she also competed in the women's 49 kg event at the 2011 World Taekwondo Olympic Qualification Tournament in Baku, Azerbaijan without qualifying for the 2012 Summer Olympics. She was eliminated in her first match by Raya Hatahet of Jordan.

References

External links 
 

Living people
Year of birth missing (living people)
Place of birth missing (living people)
Indonesian female taekwondo practitioners
Taekwondo practitioners at the 2010 Asian Games
Medalists at the 2010 Asian Games
Asian Games bronze medalists for Indonesia
Asian Games medalists in taekwondo
20th-century Indonesian women
21st-century Indonesian women